Cherry Kebab is a special kind of kebab, which is made with minced lamb and cherry. The name in Arabic is Kebab B’il Karaz. Additional names and varieties include kebab garaz (Jewish), cherry kabab, kabab bil karaz, cherry meatballs, kebab con cerezas (Mexican), and fishnah kabab (Armenian).

Place of occurrence 
Cherry kebab is a specialty dish from Aleppo, the second largest city in Syria with heritage and history. This dish is very popular by Armenians in Syria and Syrian Jews. Damascus cuisine belongs to the Levantine cuisine (also known as the Eastern Mediterranean) which includes more regions like Cyprus, Israel, Jordan, Lebanon, Palestine, and part of southern Turkey. So, cherry kebab is also found in those regions. In the Jewish part of Jerusalem, the dish is very common, it was brought by Aleppian Jews in the late 19th or early 20th century, it is called kabab dubdeban, the Jerusalemite variation is made with sumac, making it more sour.

Specificity 
Cherry kebab is a stew-like preparation. The specific of this dish is that the true version of cherry kebab requires the use of St. Lucie cherries. St. Lucie cherry (Prunus cerasus) is a small (8–10mm long), ovoid, bitter, crimson-colored cherry, smaller than its sweet counterpart. It comes in several varieties, including Aleppo, Montmorency, and Morello. Because it is sweet and sour at the same time, it perfectly blends with the richness of the lamb. Cherries give a beautiful bright purplish magenta color for this dish.

References

Skewered kebabs
Middle Eastern grilled meats
Arab cuisine
Levantine cuisine
Syrian cuisine
Israeli cuisine